The Towers of the Virgin is a series of several lofty sandstone monoliths on the west side of Zion Canyon in Zion National Park in Washington County, Utah, United States.

Description
The peaks of the Towers of the Virgin (from south to northeast) include: The Sundial, The Witch Head, Broken Tooth, Rotten Tooth, Altar of Sacrifice, Meridian Tower, Bee Hive, and The Sentinel. The Towers of the Virgin have also been known as Rock Rovers' Land, Temples of the Virgen, and Tu'-Mu-Ur-Ru-Gwait'Si-Gaip Tu-Weap' and were included in the original boundaries of what was the knowns as Zion National Monument.

Climate
Spring and fall are the most favorable seasons to visit the Towers of the Virgin. According to the Köppen climate classification system, it is located in a cold semi-arid climate zone, which is defined by the coldest month having an average mean temperature below 32 °F (0 °C), and at least 50% of the total annual precipitation being received during the spring and summer.

See also

 List of Mountains in Utah
 Geology of the Zion and Kolob canyons area
 Colorado Plateau

References

External links

Landforms of Washington County, Utah
Landmarks in Utah
Rock formations of Utah
Zion National Park